This is a partial list of herbs and herbal treatments with known or suspected adverse effects, either alone or in interaction with other herbs or drugs.  Non-inclusion of an herb in this list does not imply that it is free of adverse effects.  In general, the safety and effectiveness of alternative medicines have not been scientifically proven and remain largely unknown. Beyond adverse effects from the herb itself, "adulteration, inappropriate formulation, or lack of understanding of plant and drug interactions have led to adverse reactions that are sometimes life threatening or lethal."

Most of the adverse effects stated in this list are associated with only a small percentage of cases; they should be understood as potential risks rather than as certainties.

Herbs, treatments, and constituents with known or suspected adverse effects

Herbs with adverse drug interactions

Herbal plants associated with allergic reactions

See also
 Alternative medicine
 Herbalism
 List of branches of alternative medicine
 List of plants used in herbalism
 List of poisonous plants

References

Herbalism